Goodyera procera is a species of orchid. It is widespread across much of Asia, including China, Japan, India, Thailand, Indonesia, etc.

Goodyera procera is a 20 to 40 cm tall plant with white flowers. It does not creep. Easy to grow under lights, 20 C to 30C.  Grows well in an open medium like fine bark. Unlike many other Goodyeras, this one does not have patterns on the leaves.

References

procera
Orchids of China
Orchids of India
Orchids of Indonesia
Orchids of Thailand
Orchids of Japan
Orchids of the Philippines
Plants described in 1822